Ashley Bateman (born 2 November 1990) is a Welsh international rugby league footballer and coach who played as a  and is the current head coach for West Wales Raiders in the Betfred League 1. He was previously playing for the Crusaders RL in the Super League.

He previously played for feeder side Crusaders Colts in the National Conference before signing professionally in 2008. He made an appearance for the Crusaders (then Celtic Crusaders) in a 35–22 defeat by the Castleford Tigers in round 27 of 2009's Super League XIV. He has also represented his native Wales at international level. He made his international début in an 88–8 win over Serbia in the European Cup.

In October and November 2014, Ashley played international rugby league for the first time in 5-years. He returned after being selected to play in the 2014 European Cup.

References

External links 
Profile at raidersrugbyleague.co.uk
(archived by web.archive.org) Profile at scorpionsrl.com

1990 births
Living people
Coventry Bears players
Crusaders Rugby League players
Rugby league centres
Rugby league players from Rhondda Cynon Taf
Rugby league wingers
South Wales Scorpions coaches
South Wales Scorpions players
Wales national rugby league team players
Welsh rugby league coaches
Welsh rugby league players